Pipikaula ("beef rope") is a Hawaiian cuisine dish of salted and dried beef similar to beef jerky. Pipikaula was eaten by Hawaiian cowboys (paniolos). It was usually broiled before serving.

History
In the 19th century John Parker brought Mexican cowboys to train the Hawaiians in cattle ranching. The Hawaiian cowboys of Kamuela and Kula came to be called paniolos. Cattle ranching grew rapidly for the next one hundred years. In 1960, half of the land in Hawaii was devoted to ranching for beef export, but by 1990 the number had shrunk to 25 percent.  The paniolos chewed pipikaula.

With the influence of Asian cooking, beef strips are commonly marinated in soy sauce.  When beef is dried in the sun, a screened box is traditionally used to keep the meat from dust and flies.  Dried meat could often be found as a relish or appetizer at a lū‘au.

References

Hawaiian cuisine
Beef dishes